"Rookie of the Year" is a 1955 half-hour baseball drama directed by John Ford and starring John Wayne, Vera Miles, Ward Bond, and Patrick Wayne, all of whom Ford would direct in The Searchers the following year.  This film was an installment of the television anthology series Screen Director's Playhouse.

A sportswriter (John Wayne) realizes that a talented young rookie (Patrick Wayne) is the son of a former Chicago White Sox player (Ward Bond), who was banned from playing Major League Baseball for life because of his participation in the 1919 World Series scandal, a.k.a. the Black Sox Scandal. All the characters in this story are fictional, but the character played by Ward Bond is strongly suggestive of the real Shoeless Joe Jackson.

Patrick Wayne would later play a similar role in a 1962 television drama, also directed by John Ford, called Flashing Spikes, starring James Stewart and featuring John Wayne in a lengthy surprise appearance for which he was billed as "Michael Morris."

Cast
John Wayne as Mike Cronin
Vera Miles as Ruth Dahlberg
Ward Bond as Buck Goodhue
Pat Wayne as Lyn Goodhue
James Gleason as Ed Shafer
Willis Bouchey as Cully
Harry Tyler as Mr. White
William Forrest as Walker
Robert Leyden as Willie
Tiger Fafara as Bobby

External links
 "Rookie of the Year" in the Internet Movie Database
 Senses of Cinema: Flashing Spikes

1955 American television episodes
Television anthology episodes
Television plays